KFOG (1250 kHz, "Power 92 Jams") is a commercial AM radio station located in Little Rock, Arkansas. It simulcasts the urban contemporary radio format of sister station 92.3 KIPR and is owned by Cumulus Media. The station's studios are located in West Little Rock and the transmitter is located in College Station.

Until September 6, 2019, the station was called KPZK (a dual meaning for "People's" and Pulaski County), when Cumulus warehoused the heritage calls of KFOG in San Francisco (which had switched to a sports format as KNBR-FM) on the station to prevent competitor re-use in the San Francisco Bay Area.

References

External links
FCC History Cards for KFOG
Official website

FOG (AM)
[[Category:Urban contemporary 
radio stations in the United States]]
Radio stations established in 1986
Cumulus Media radio stations